Strange Gamble is a 1948 American Western film directed by George Archainbaud, written by Doris Schroeder, Bennett Cohen and Ande Lamb, and starring William Boyd, Andy Clyde, Rand Brooks, Elaine Riley, James Craven and Robert Williams. It was released on October 8, 1948, by United Artists.

This film was the 63rd and final of the series based on the Clarence E. Mulford character, Hopalong Cassidy.

Plot

Cast 
 William Boyd as Hopalong Cassidy
 Andy Clyde as California Carlson
 Rand Brooks as Lucky Jenkins
 Elaine Riley as Nora Murray
 James Craven as Mordigan
 Robert Williams as Henchman Pete Walters 
 Alberto Morin as Ramón DeLara 
 Joel Friedkin as Doc White
 Herbert Rawlinson as John Murray
 Francis McDonald as Henchman Longhorn
 William F. Leicester as Sid Murray 
 Joan Barton as Mary Murray
 Lee Tung Foo as Wong

References

External links 
 
 
 
 

1948 films
American black-and-white films
Films directed by George Archainbaud
United Artists films
American Western (genre) films
1948 Western (genre) films
Hopalong Cassidy films
Films scored by Raoul Kraushaar
1940s English-language films
1940s American films